Megna is a surname. Notable people with the surname include:

 Jaycob Megna (born 1992), American ice hockey player with the Seattle Kraken
 Jayson Megna (born 1990), American ice hockey player with the Anaheim Ducks 
 John Megna (1952–1995), American actor
 Marc Megna (born 1976), American football player
 Robert Megna (born 1958), American politician 
 Vince Megna (born 1944), American attorney

See also
Meghna (disambiguation)
Magna (disambiguation)